Yusuf Dia Pasha al-Khalidi (1842–1906;) was a prominent Ottoman politician who served as mayor of Jerusalem during several non-consecutive terms in the nineteenth and early twentieth centuries.

Early life and education
Al-Khalidi was born in Jerusalem in 1842. His father, al-Sayyid Muhammad Ali al-Khalidi, served as deputy qadi and chief of the Jerusalem Sharia court secretariat in Jerusalem for about fifty years. Members of the Khalidi family, one of the two politically prominent, old families of the local nobility (the other being the al-Husayni family), continuously held the office through the 18th and 19th centuries. Although the Husayni family was larger and wealthier, the Khalidis were more united and noted for their intellect.  As a teenager, al-Khalidi may have been influenced by the Ottoman Reform Edict of 1856. At the age of 17, he wrote of his thoughts about the state of the world, personal dignity and the individual's quest to become free, in the context of meditations on why the Ottoman Empire was being increasingly surrounded by European powers pilfering the region of its wealth and identified the cause of the situation to be the disparity in knowledge between the region and Europe.  The interests of the country could only be defended by dropping frivolous studies and acquiring scientific, historical and philosophical knowledge.

Yousef's initial requests to receive an education in Egypt was turned down because he lacked an invitation from that country and his father rebuffed his proposal that he be educated in Europe. Afterward he and his cousin Husayn left Jerusalem without the family's permission and reached Malta where they were enrolled into the Protestant college through the mediation of the Anglican bishop Gobat of Jerusalem. There, he studied English and French, and then continued to study Semitic languages in the Oriental Academy of Vienna. Yousef's brother Yasin persuaded him after two years in the Protestant college to attend the Imperial Medical School in Constantinople, capital of the Empire. Yousef was dissatisfied with his time at the medical school after a year, finding no "salvation, he enrolled in an American Protestant missionary school outside of the capital, Robert College." He remained there for a year and a half before returning to Jerusalem because of the death of his father.

Career

Al-Khalidi played a key role in the opposing political factions established to prohibit the Ottoman Empire's attempts to violate the constitution. He also wrote the first Kurdish-Arabic dictionary. al-Khalidi was very familiar with Zionist thought, and the anti-Semitic environment in Europe out of which it emerged. He also perceived the danger Zionism could expose Jews to throughout the domains of the Ottoman Empire. In 1899, compelled by a "holy duty of conscience" to voice his concerns that Zionism would jeopardize the friendly associations between Muslims, Christians and Jews, he wrote a letter to Zadok Kahn, the chief rabbi of France, to prevail on Zionists, through Kahn's offices, to leave Palestine in peace. Thus he wrote: "Who can deny the rights of the Jews to Palestine? My God, historically it is your country!",

Khalidi suggested that, since Palestine was already inhabited, the Zionists should find another place for the implementation of their political goals. " ... in the name of God," he wrote, "let Palestine be left alone."  According to Rashid Khalidi, Alexander Scholch and Dominique Perrin, Khalidi was prescient in predicting that, regardless of Jewish historic rights, given the geopolitical context, Zionism could stir an awakening of Arab nationalism uniting Christians and Muslims.

Kahn showed the letter to Theodor Herzl, the founder of political Zionism. On 19 March 1899 Herzl replied to al-Khalidi in French arguing that both the Ottoman Empire and the non-Jewish population of Palestine would benefit from Jewish immigration As to al-Khalidi concerns about the non-Jewish majority population of Palestine, Herzl replied rhetorically: "who would think of sending them away?". Rashid Khalidi notes that this was penned 4 years after Herzl had confided to his diary the idea of spiriting the Arab population away to make way for Jews:
We must expropriate gently the private property on the estates assigned to us. We shall try  to spirit the penniless population across the border by procuring employment for it in the transit countries, while denying it employment in our own country The property owners will come over to our side. Both the process of expropriation and the removal of the poor must be carried out discreetly and circumspectly.'

and concluded ambiguously that "If he (the Ottoman Sultan) will not accept it, we will search and, believe me, we will find elsewhere what we need."

Al Khalidi served as mayor of Jerusalem from the years 1870 to 1876, 1878 to 1879, and 1899 to 1906.

Death
Al-Khalidi died on 25 January 1906.

Notes

Citations

Sources

External links 
 A Family’s History by Tarif Khalidi October 2020 at khalidilibrary.org 
 AL-KHALIDI, YUSSEF DIYA'UDDIN (PASHA) (1829-1907) at passia.org Palestinian Academic Society for the Study of International Affairs PASSIA
 Khalidi takes on "hegemonic narrative" of Jewish nationalism in personal new book by Steve France at Mondoweiss February 17, 2020
 Temple Denial by Benny Morris at The Daily Beast Apr. 24, 2012 

1829 births
1907 deaths
19th-century Arabs
Arabs in Ottoman Palestine
Khalidi family
Mayors of Jerusalem
Zionism in the Arab world